Walthamstow Village is the oldest part of Walthamstow, east London. It was designated a Conservation Area by the London Borough of Waltham Forest in 1967, and another Conservation Area on nearby Orford Road was subsequently added. The area centres on St. Mary's Church, which was founded in the 12th century. Across the road from this is a 15th-century timber-framed hall house called "The Ancient House", which was restored in 1934 and 2002. Nearby are almshouses dating from the 16th and 18th centuries, and the Vestry House Museum, which has been used as a workhouse and police station, but has been a museum since 1931.  It also holds the archives of the borough and a local studies library.

Orford Road, the ancient road leading up to St Mary's church, has in recent years developed as a street of small restaurants, cafes and a local supermarket. There are also several pubs in the area.

Transport and locale

Nearest stations
 Walthamstow Central station
 Wood Street railway station

Bus routes
 There is one bus route, the W12, which operates a hail-and-ride service in the area.

Places of interest
 Vestry House Museum
 The Ancient House
 St. Mary's Church, Walthamstow
 Orford House

References

External links
Walthamstow Village News and Residents Association
Vestry House Museum

Areas of London
Districts of the London Borough of Waltham Forest
Walthamstow